Bala Ibn Na'allah (born June 2, 1967 in Zuru, Kebbi State) is a Nigerian politician and senator. He is representing Kebbi South Senatorial seat in the Senate of Nigeria and was the Deputy Majority leader in the 8th Nigerian senate. On August 29, 2021, Na'allah's eldest son, Abdulkarim Bala Na'Allah was murdered by unknown assailants in his residence in Kaduna state.

References 

Living people
Members of the Senate (Nigeria)
1967 births